Amy Marren (born 14 August 1998) is a British para swimmer who became the SM9 200m individual medley world champion at the 2013 IPC Swimming World Championships. At the same championships, she won gold in the S9 100m butterfly, as well as being a member of the British women’s relay teams that won both the 4x100m freestyle relay and the 4x100m medley relay (breaking the previous world record, also set by GB in 2011, by six seconds). Marren also won silver medals in the S9 100m backstroke and the S9 100m freestyle, finishing behind British teammate Stephanie Millward. 

Marren won a bronze medal in the 200m individual medley at the 2016 Paralympic Games in Rio, after only qualifying for the GB Team by 0.2 seconds.

References

External links
swimming.org
YSPOTY 2013 nominees: Amy Marren Q&A

1998 births
Living people
Paralympic swimmers of Great Britain
Swimmers at the 2012 Summer Paralympics
People from the London Borough of Newham
S9-classified Paralympic swimmers
Medalists at the 2016 Summer Paralympics
Medalists at the World Para Swimming Championships
Medalists at the World Para Swimming European Championships
Paralympic medalists in swimming
Paralympic bronze medalists for Great Britain
British female backstroke swimmers
British female butterfly swimmers
British female medley swimmers
21st-century British women